Frantz Funck-Brentano (15 June 1862 – 13 June 1947) was a French historian and librarian. He was born in the castle of Munsbach (Luxembourg) and died at Montfermeil. He was a son of Théophile Funck-Brentano.

Biography 
After graduating at a young age from the prestigious École Nationale des Chartes, Frantz Funck-Brentano was in 1885 named curator of the Bibliothèque de l'Arsenal, of which he never became director. His research focused especially on the Ancien Régime, primarily because this library housed the archive of documents from the Bastille, which represented an incomparable source for the history, in particular the political history of the Ancien Régime. Funck-Bentano himself compiled the voluminous and exhaustive catalogue of this archive while he was curator. The depths of this resource led him to study all aspects of the history of the Ancien Régime: its institutions, peculiarities, personalities and famous events, which he made the subject of highly referenced books that brought great success to the library.

In 1900 he became replacement professor at the Collège de France, in the chair of comparative legislative history, where he dealt with the foundation of western European cities.

In 1905 he was appointed a principal lecturer of the Alliance française to the United States. At the same time he was mandated by the French government to study the spread of French literature in the United States, Canada and Cuba. In this capacity he spoke before President Theodore Roosevelt in the White House. On his return to France, he was made a knight of the Légion d'honneur.

In 1909 he spoke before French circles of Austria-Hungary, in Vienna, Prague and Budapest, on the history of France through the ages.

After this he served several times as lecturer for the Alliance française, in the Netherlands, England, Denmark, Sweden and Norway, Romania and Russia. In 1907 the Académie des inscriptions et belles-lettres awarding him the important Prix Berger for his works on the history of Paris. He was elected member of the Académie des sciences morales et politiques in 1928, and president of the Société des études historiques.

Alongside his academic work, Funck-Brentano pursued a literary career, writing plays and popular historical works, and in journalism: he contributed notably to Minerva, a nationalist and monarchist historical and critical review, to Revue d'Action française and Charles Maurras's Action Française. His involvement with extreme right-wing politics also influenced his work; a major part of his Marat ou le mensonge des mots (1941) consists of a virulent attack on Marat, whom he describes as a "semite", riddled with classic antisemitic themes of the day.

One of his sons, Christian Funck-Bentano (1894–1966) was among the founders of the newspaper Le Monde; another, Claude Théophile (born 1892) was shot down on the front at Vosges in February 1916. He is commemorated at Pair-et-Grandrupt.

Literary works 
1896: Philippe le Bel en Flandre (doctoral thesis)
1900: Le drame des poisons
1903: Grandeur et Décadence des Aristocraties
1912: Rosette, ou l'Amoureuse conspiration (novel, with André de Lorde)
1922: The National History of France: The Middle Ages (English translation: Elizabeth O'Neill, M.A.)
1926: L'Ancien régime
1926: Les lettres de cachet
1932: Les secrets de la Bastille

External links
 
 
 

19th-century Luxembourgian historians
20th-century French historians
Members of the Académie des sciences morales et politiques
French librarians
1862 births
1947 deaths
People from Schuttrange
French male non-fiction writers
École Nationale des Chartes alumni
19th-century French historians